HMS P41 was a Royal Navy U-class submarine built by Vickers-Armstrong. She was transferred to the exiled Royal Norwegian Navy before completion and renamed HNoMS Uredd.  She and one of the B-class in 1940 have so far been the only Norwegian submarines to have been sunk.

Service history
Ordered on 11 March 1940, the submarine was laid down at the Vickers-Armstrongs shipyard in Barrow-in-Furness on 15 October 1940, and launched on 24 August 1941.

She was transferred to Norwegian command on 7 December 1941. She served mostly as a patrol craft off the coast of Nazi-occupied Norway, eventually completing a total of seven successful missions for the Royal Norwegian Navy, sinking several German ships.

Contact with Uredd was lost and she was believed to have been sunk in a German minefield on 10 February. The Royal Norwegian Navy officially declared her lost on 20 February 1943, the Royal Navy on 28 February.

In 1985,  discovered the wreckage of the Uredd southwest of Fugløyvær and confirmed that she had hit a German minefield laid by the German minelayer  - killing the crew of 34 and six soldiers. The following year, King Olav V unveiled a memorial to those lost aboard the Uredd, located in Grensen. The wreck is officially a war grave.

As HNoMS Uredd was operating with the Royal Navy's 9th Submarine Flotilla based at Dundee in Scotland, her crew are all commemorated on Dundee International Submarine Memorial.

References
Notes

Bibliography
 
 
 
 Hutchinson, Robert,  Submarines, War Beneath The Waves, From 1776 To The Present Day

External links
 Royal Norwegian Submarine flotilla history page (Norwegian)

 

Ships built in Barrow-in-Furness
1941 ships
World War II submarines of the United Kingdom
British U-class submarines of the Royal Norwegian Navy
World War II submarines of Norway
Lost submarines of Norway
Maritime incidents in February 1943
World War II shipwrecks in the Norwegian Sea
Ships sunk by mines
Ships lost with all hands